TFM is an Independent Local Radio station based in Newcastle upon Tyne, England, owned and operated by Bauer as part of the Hits Radio network. It broadcasts to Teesside and surrounding areas of County Durham and North Yorkshire.

As of December 2022, the station has a weekly audience of 137,000 listeners according to RAJAR.

History

Radio Tees
Radio Tees opened at 6am on Tuesday 24 June 1975, broadcasting on 257 metres medium wave from the converted Water Board buildings at 74 Dovecot Street, Stockton-on-Tees.

The first presenter on air was breakfast show host Les Ross and the first record played was "Everything's Tuesday" by Chairmen of the Board. By the autumn of that year, Radio Tees was also broadcasting on 95 VHF - the first local radio station in the area to broadcast on FM.

By the mid-1980s Radio Tees found itself in financial difficulties, and in 1986, its parent company, Sound Broadcasting (Teesside) Ltd, was bought by Metropolitan Broadcasting (or the Metro Radio group as it was known, for it owned Metro Radio in Newcastle upon Tyne). In November, that year Radio Tees moved its FM frequency to 96.6 in a direct swap with BBC Radio Cleveland (currently known as BBC Radio Tees).

TFM
In January 1988, thirteen years after launch, Radio Tees was rebranded to TFM 96.6 after being taken over by Newcastle upon Tyne-based Metro Radio Group. This relaunch also helped modernise the brand. Shortly after this, in April 1989, its 257 metres, 1170 kHz medium wave frequency was split and this became Great North Radio (GNR). This was launched after broadcasting rules meant TFM could not broadcast on both FM and medium wave.

In 1992 TFM vacated its old Dovecot Street studios and moved to new, purpose-built studios in Thornaby-on-Tees.

In 1998 Metropolitan Broadcasting was taken over by EMAP; 'TFM' was renamed '96.6 TFM' and brought into EMAP's north of England Independent Local Radio Big City Network.

In July 2007, 96.6 TFM was rebranded TFM Radio and re-adopted the slogan 'Today's Favourite Music' which had first been used in the late 1990s. In 2008, EMAP plc was bought by Bauer Media, a privately owned German-based family business, with the radio group being renamed Bauer Place.

Merger 

As of Monday 8 April 2013, all programming is shared with sister station Metro Radio in Newcastle. The TFM branding was retained along with separate news bulletins and advertising. The two stations were able to merge without consultation because both the TFM and Metro licence areas are located in one OFCOM-approved broadcast area (North East England).

The TFM studios in Thornaby were closed and remaining staff were moved to Newcastle. Most on-air staff were made redundant, including breakfast presenters Wayne Tunnicliffe and Amy McConnell, who were replaced by Metro Radio counterparts Steve Furnell and Karen Wight., although two journalists continued to be based locally for news-gathering in the TFM area. Despite the merger, RAJAR reported an increase in weekly listener reach for TFM during the second quarter of 2013.

Programming
Networked programming originates from Bauer's Manchester headquarters.

Regional programming is produced and broadcast from Bauer's Newcastle studios, weekdays 6-10am (Steve & Karen's Breakfast Show) and is syndicated with TFM.

News
Bauer's Newcastle newsroom broadcasts local news bulletins for TFM hourly from 6am-7pm on weekdays and from 7am-1pm on Saturdays and Sundays. Headlines are broadcast on the half hour during weekday breakfast and drivetime shows, alongside traffic bulletins.

National bulletins from Sky News Radio are carried overnight with bespoke networked bulletins on weekend afternoons, usually originating from Bauer's Leeds newsroom.

Former programmes

Radio Tees programming
Marketing itself as 'A Friend Who's Always Near' and 'The Sound of Home', Radio Tees offered unique and distinctive local output with a wide variety of programming and an emphasis on community involvement. Many of its presenters, such as Alastair Pirrie, Mark Page, John Simons, Mark Matthews and Graham Robb, derive from the local area.

Alongside specialist soul, blues and country music shows, Radio Tees programmes included the hi-fi show Sounds Superb, the motoring show Sidelight and the holiday show Trains and Boats and Planes in which Radio Tees presenters would travel to destinations around the world and record reports interviewing local people and giving tourist advice and information.

Radio Tees also met and interviewed artists over the years both in mainstream and specialist music genres including soul music legend Bobby Womack interviewed in 1985 by the then Nightlife show presenter, Mike Prior.

Late On
A notable programme from the Radio Tees era was Late On, presented by Graham Robb, which ran from 10pm to 1am every weekday evening in 1984. The show featured characters such as Rita the cleaner, Mad Tom the handyman, Ginger Johnson (ex-RAF) and Superstar Cecil, the proprietor of 'The Balloon and Feather' pub.

Around the time of Late On, the station briefly experimented with over-the-air software downloads for popular home computers of the time, usually broadcasting them after Robb's show finished at 1am.

Event programming
Radio Tees reported at local events, broadcasting from the Cleveland and Darlington Shows, the Teesside Air Show and the Teesside Steel Family Gala.

The station often organized its own outside broadcast events as well, many of which took place in John Walker Square, off Stockton-on-Tees High Street. For a few months during 1985, Radio Tees had its own light aircraft for traffic, named Flying Eye, kept at Teesside Airport, from which Graham Robb reported on traffic conditions and which featured daily on John Simons' breakfast show.

Notable presenters
Some former Radio Tees/TFM Radio presenters have gone on to work in the UK national media. These include Mark Page, who briefly worked as a presenter for BBC Radio 1 in the 1980s and Alex Lester, who presented the 3am6am show on BBC Radio 2 from 1990 to 2016.

The late Alastair Pirrie, 'The Big P on the Big T' – host of afternoon show Pirrie PM, which was part of the opening day's schedule – went on to host cult Tyne Tees TV children's pop show Razzamatazz between 1981 and 1987.

It is in the areas of news and sport that Radio Tees has given well-known figures in the UK broadcasting industry. Jeff Stelling a Sky Sports presenter, Helen Boaden Director of BBC News, and Mark Mardell BBC Europe Editor.

References

External links 
 TFM

Bauer Radio
Hits Radio
Radio stations in North East England
Radio stations established in 1975